The regions of Uganda are known as Central, Western, Eastern, and Northern. These four regions are in turn divided into districts. There were 56 districts in 2002, which expanded into 111 districts plus one city (Kampala) by 2010.

The national government interacts directly with the districts, so regions do not have any definite  role in administration. Under British rule before 1962, the regions were functional administrative units and were called provinces, headed by a Provincial Commissioner. The central region is the kingdom of Buganda, which then had a semi-autonomous government headed by the Kabaka (king). The equivalent of the Provincial Commissioner for Buganda was called the Resident.

At Uganda's 2002 census, the Central region (It is coterminous with the Kingdom of Buganda, one of the ancient African monarchies that are constitutionally recognised in Uganda) contained 27 percent of the country's population, the Western region contained 26 percent, and Eastern region 25 percent, and the Northern region had 22 percent.

The country's population density by region was 226 persons per square kilometre in the Eastern region, 176 per square kilometre in the Central region, 126 per square kilometre in the Western region, and 65 per square kilometre in the Northern region.

In 2002, approximately 3 million people, or 12 percent of the country's population, lived in urban areas. The Central region had 54 percent of the urban population (mostly in the city of Kampala), the Northern region 17 percent, the Western region 14 percent, and the Eastern region 13 percent.

See also
List of regions of Uganda by Human Development Index
Counties of Uganda
 Sub-counties of Uganda
 Uganda Local Governments Association
 ISO 3166-2:UG

References

External links

 
Subdivisions of Uganda
Uganda 0
Uganda geography-related lists

pt:Regiões de Uganda